The Pictured Cliffs Formation is a Campanian geologic formation in the San Juan Basin of New Mexico. Dinosaur remains are among the fossils that have been recovered from the formation, although none have yet been referred to a specific genus.

Description
The formation consists of yellowish-gray to grayish-orange cliff-forming sandstone. The upper beds are massive and crossbedded, consisting of well-sorted, fine-grained, friable sandstone. The lower beds are alternating thin beds of sandstone and light- to dark-gray silty shale. The formation is transitional with both the underlying Lewis Shale and the overlying Fruitland Formation.

The formation is interpreted as a marine littoral formation deposited during the final regression of the Western Interior Seaway from the San Juan Basin, with recognizable delta-front and barrier island facies. The regression was interrupted by at least three brief transgressions that produced tongues of the upper Pictured Cliff Sandstone in the northern San Juan Basin.

Fossils
The formation contains fossil marine invertebrates and trace fossil Ophiomorpha major, typical of a nearshore marine environment.

Economic geology
The formation serves as a reservoir rock for natural gas. Production by 1988 amounted to 87.7 x 109 cubic meters with remaining reserves estimated at that time as 127.4  x 109 cubic meters. The gas likely originated both in the underlying Lewis Shale and the coal beds of the overlying Fruitland Formation.

History of investigation
The formation was first described as the Pictured Cliffs group or Pictured Cliffs sandstone by W.H. Holmes in 1877.

See also

 List of dinosaur-bearing rock formations
 List of stratigraphic units with indeterminate dinosaur fossils

Footnotes

References
 
 
 
 
 
 

Campanian Stage
Cretaceous formations of New Mexico